Roger Mitchell or Michell may refer to:

Film and TV
Roger Michell, English film director
E. Roger Mitchell (born 1971), American actor

Others
Roger Mitchell, an accountant who co-founded Marwick, Mitchell & Co., one of the predecessor firms to KPMG
Roger Mitchell (editor) of The Minnesota Review
Roger Mitchell, see History of tuberculosis
Roger Michell (MP) for Derbyshire (UK Parliament constituency)